Local elections were held in all municipalities in Bulgaria on 25 October 2015 (first round) and on 1 November 2015 (second round). Voters elected municipal mayors, village mayors and members of municipal councils of 265 municipalities. They were held alongside a referendum on the electoral code.

Background
The local elections took place after two years of political instability and it was a test for the one year old fragile ruling central-right coalition led by GERB party. Analysts expected the elections to bring a serious changes in the government of Boyko Borisov. A national referendum was also scheduled together with the local elections. The referendum was initiated by the President of Bulgaria, Rosen Plevneliev on online voting, after the other two questions about mandatory voting and majority rep ware rejected by the parliament.

Controversy
The election campaign was accompanied by multiple scandals about vote-buying, voting tourists and arrests. On the election day, the election authorities in some polling stations did not provide ballots. After the first round, members of election officials were kept 48 hours locked in the election authority counting center at Arena Aremeec Hall.

Results

First round
GERB, the leading party in the government central-right conditionally won 34.5% of the vote and their incumbent mayors were reelected in Sofia, Burgas, Varna, Veliko Tarnov, Stara Zagora, Blagoevgrad and Haskovo. Second and third were the opposition parties the Bulgarian Socialist Party with 17.2% and the Right and Freedom Movement (the Turkish ethnic party) with 14.6% and the Bulgarian Socialist Party. The smaller parties from the ruling coalition, the Reformist Block, ABV and the Patriot Front, got respectively 9%, 4.3% and 5.2%.

The turnout of the first round was 53.6% which was 5% higher than 2011 local elections.

References

2015
2015 elections in Bulgaria
October 2015 events in Europe